Heidi Shierholz (born October 10, 1971) was Chief Economist to the U.S. Secretary of Labor, serving under Secretary Thomas Perez. Shierholz is president of the Economic Policy Institute, a think tank based in Washington, D.C. that advocates for liberal views. Shierholz was previously a labor market economist with EPI.

Education
Shierholz studied mathematics at Grinnell College in Grinnell, Iowa, earning a B.A. in 1994. She earned a M.S. in statistics at Iowa State University in 1996. She then studied economics at the University of Michigan, earning a M.A. in 2001 and Ph.D. in 2005.

Career
Shierholz worked as an assistant professor of economics at the University of Toronto from 2005 to 2007. Shierholz joined the Economic Policy Institute (EPI) in 2007. At EPI, Shierholz worked on unemployment policy, ways to support the long-term unemployed, and possible policies to pull America out of the recession. She coauthored two editions of The State of Working America, EPI's flagship publication. Before joining the Department of Labor, Shierholz regularly wrote for a number of publications, including U.S. News & World Report column "Economic Intelligence," the Washington Post, and the Huffington Post. She has been called to testify before Congress on labor market issues, including unemployment insurance and immigration.

Notable publications

References

1971 births
21st-century American economists
American women economists
Chief Economists of the United States Department of Labor
Economists from Oklahoma
Grinnell College alumni
Iowa State University alumni
Living people
Obama administration personnel
Politicians from Muskogee, Oklahoma
University of Michigan alumni
21st-century American women